Water Skiing has been contested at the Pan American Games since in 1995, without ever leaving the program.

Medal table

References

 
Water skiing